Qaleh Kati or Qaleh Koti may refer to:
 Qaleh Koti, Nur